Salvador Botella Rodrigo (March 27, 1929 – December 18, 2006) was a Spanish road bicycle racer, who competed as a professional from 1953 to 1962. He won the Volta a Catalunya in 1953 and 1959. He participated in 19 Grand Tours, including eight editions of the Vuelta a España, seven of the Giro d'Italia, and four of the Tour de France. He won the Points classification in 1958 Vuelta a España.

Major results

1953
 1st  Volta a Catalunya
1st Stage 3
1954
 1st Stage 3 Euskal Bizikleta
 1st Overall Vuelta a Levante
 4th Overall Volta a Catalunya
1955
 1st Trofeo Jaumendreu
 1st Stage 10 Volta a Catalunya
 1st Stage 3 Tour des Pyrénées
 2nd Overall Vuelta a Andalucía
1st Stage 8
 8th Overall Giro d'Italia
1956
 1st Stage 4 Euskal Bizikleta
 2nd Trofeo Jaumendreu
1957
 2nd Overall Vuelta a Levante
1st Stages 4 & 6
 2nd Overall Volta a Catalunya
1st Stage 8
 3rd Overall Vuelta a La Rioja
1st Stages 2 & 3
 6th Trofeo Masferrer
 10th Overall Vuelta a España
1958
 1st  Points classification Vuelta a España
 1st Stage 3 Giro d'Italia
 2nd National Road Race Championships
1959
 1st  Volta a Catalunya
 3rd Overall Euskal Bizikleta
1960
 1st Stage 4 Giro d'Italia
 7th Overall Vuelta a España
1st Stages 1 (TTT) & 9
1961
 1st Overall Vuelta a Levante
 1st Stages 6 & 8 Vuelta a Andalucía

References

Spanish male cyclists
1929 births
2006 deaths
People from Ribera Alta (comarca)
Sportspeople from the Province of Valencia
Cyclists from the Valencian Community
Spanish Vuelta a España stage winners
Spanish Giro d'Italia stage winners